Andrzej Kozłowski (born 29 June 1968) is a Polish weightlifter. He competed in the men's middleweight event at the 1992 Summer Olympics.

References

1968 births
Living people
Polish male weightlifters
Olympic weightlifters of Poland
Weightlifters at the 1992 Summer Olympics
Sportspeople from Kyiv
Soviet people of Polish descent
Ukrainian people of Polish descent
Ukrainian emigrants to Poland